Harry L. Rattenberry (December 14, 1857 – December 9, 1925) was an American actor. He appeared in more than 120 films between 1913 and 1925. He was born in Sacramento, California and died in Los Angeles, California. His parents were William Henry Rattenberry and Mary Ann Broomhead, a former wife of notable Mormon missionary Cyrus H. Wheelock.

Rattenberry's performances on stage included work with the stock companies at the Alcazar, Central, and Tivoli theaters in San Francisco.

Rattenberry's wife, Cora, died in July 1910.

Partial filmography

 Lucille Love, Girl of Mystery (1914)
 Wanted: A Leading Lady (1915)
 Where the Heather Blooms (1915)
 Love and a Savage (1915)
 Some Chaperone (1915)
 Oliver Twist (1916)
 A Marked Man (1917)
 '49–'17 (1917)
 The Mysterious Mr. Tiller (1917)
 Indiscreet Corinne (1917)
 High Speed (1917)
 Limousine Life (1918)
 Almost Married (1919)
 The Poor Simp (1920)
 The Broken Spur (1921)
 A Motion to Adjourn (1921)
 Watch Your Step (1922)
 The Weak-End Party (1922)
 Soul of the Beast (1923)
 The Printer's Devil (1923)
 Zeb vs. Paprika (1924)
 The Dramatic Life of Abraham Lincoln (1924)

References

External links

1857 births
1925 deaths
American male silent film actors
20th-century American male actors
Male actors from California
American male stage actors